The Bangladesh Cine-Journalist Association is an organization of film journalists. It was first established in the name of Pakistan Film Journalist Association in Dhaka in East Pakistan. After the independence of Bangladesh, it was renamed as Bangladesh Cine-Journalist Association. It was revived in 1973–74 with the introduction of the Bachsas Awards. Poet, Journalist, Media Personality and Film Director Raju Alim is serving as the current president.

History

Naming 
The Pakistan Film Journalists Association was formed at a meeting of the film journalists of Pakistan on 5 April 1968, after the independence of Bangladesh. Which is briefly called Bachsas.

Golden Jubilee 
Bangladesh Film Journalist Association celebrates its golden jubilee by completing three years of establishment in 50 years. But after the independence war of Bangladesh, Bachsas offers awards to stars of different stages of Bangladesh's film production every year. But there are other activities of the organization for 5 years from 2014 to 2018, but the reward program stops. The Bachsas Film Award from the next 5-year release was presented on 5 April 2019 edition of the prize distribution at a portion of Bachsa's Golden Jubilee Festival. In addition to distributing prizes, seminars, posters, posters and film exhibitions were held at the Golden Jubilee.

Bachsas Award 
Bangladesh Cine-Journalists' Association gave out their most prestigious awards to outstanding performers in film, television, music, dance and theatre.

See also 
 National Film Awards

References 

Organisations based in Dhaka
Bachsas Awards